Diocese of Singapore may refer to one of the following:
 Anglican Diocese of Singapore
 Anglican Diocese of Singapore (1909)
 Archdiocese of Singapore (Roman Catholic)
 Diocese of Singapore (Russian Orthodox Church)